Newbold Comyn is a park on the Eastern edge of Leamington Spa, Warwickshire, England.

History 

The first mention of Newbold Comyn in history was in the Domesday Book of 1086, which lists one of Leamington's two mills as being situated there. The name Comyn is derived from the Norman Comyn family who owned the land between 1160 and 1200. In 1539 Richard Willes and William Morcote jointly purchased the land that was now a farm. When Richard Willes died in 1564 his son inherited the whole estate as Richard had married Morcote's daughter. At the end of the 18th century the Revd. Edward Willes built a new house on the estate in addition to the existing farm house. The Revd. Edward Willes died in 1820, and his son, also Edward, began to sell parts of the estate for building in 1823 as Leamington grew into a spa town. In all the Willes family held Newbold Comyn for over 400 years, until they sold most of the remaining estate to Leamington Corporation after the end of the Second World War. The Willes family moved to Honington in South Warwickshire, and sold the mansion house to a subsidiary of AC Lloyd (Builders) in 1964. The main house, which stood where now the junction of Newbold Terrace East and Fernhill Drive is, was demolished in 1965, leaving only the farm and outbuildings. During the Second World War the Luftwaffe dumped two bombs on the park whilst returning to base from Coventry. The craters can still be seen. The Corporation laid out the leisure park in the 1970s and the land usage has remained the same ever since although it is now run by Warwick District Council. There used to be an old steam engine on which young people could climb and play, but this had to be removed due to health and safety regulations.

Modern day park and facilities 

Today the park is over 120 hectares (300 acres) in area. There is rugby, football and cricket. There are two children's play areas, a skate park and a BMX track. On the town side of the park is the town's Leisure Centre which has two swimming pools (a 25-metre pool and a children's pool), an aerobics studio and a gym. Fishing is allowed on the River Leam which passes through the park. The park is mainly flat but there is a hill with a beacon at the top of it from which there are fine views of south Warwickshire. At the bottom of the hill is the Newbold Comym Arms, converted from the farmhouse to a pub. The pub serves food, as does the cafe at the leisure centre. The park is the only public open space in Warwick District where barbecues are allowed. There is car parking at the leisure centre. As of September 2018 the municipal golf course is closed with the future of the land under review. A Parkrun takes places every Saturday morning.

In late 2009 the park briefly made news in the local paper when there were rumoured sightings of a lynx on the golf course. The big cat was dubbed the "Beast of Newbold Comyn" by the media.

Landmarks

The Newbold Comyn Arms, formerly a farmhouse and now a public house, is a listed building located in the park.

See also
Royal Pump Room Gardens

References

External links
Official Park Site on Warwick District Council page

Newbold Comyn
Newbold Comyn